Adiora is a small village and seat of the commune of Ouinerden in the Cercle of Gourma-Rharous in the Tombouctou Region of Mali.

References 

Populated places in Tombouctou Region